The scute-snouted calyptotis (Calyptotis scutirostrum)  is a species of skink found in New South Wales and Queensland in Australia.

References

Calyptotis
Reptiles described in 1874
Taxa named by Wilhelm Peters